A sortie (from the French word meaning exit or from Latin root surgere meaning to "rise up") is a deployment or dispatch of one military unit, be it an aircraft, ship, or troops, from a strongpoint. The term originated in siege warfare.

In aviation
In military aviation, a sortie is a combat mission of an individual aircraft, starting when the aircraft takes off. For example, one mission involving six aircraft would tally six sorties. The sortie rate is the number of sorties that a given unit can support in a given time.

In siege warfare
In siege warfare, the word sortie refers specifically to a sudden issuing of troops against the enemy from a defensive position—that is, an attack launched against the besiegers by the defenders. If the sortie is through a sally port, the verb to sally may be used interchangeably with to sortie.

Purposes of sorties include harassment of enemy troops, destruction of siege weaponry and engineering works, joining the relief force, etc.

Sir John Thomas Jones, analyzing a number of sieges carried out during the Peninsular War (1807–1814), wrote:

References

Military terminology
Siege warfare